Iberia Flight 1456 was a scheduled flight from Barcelona-El Prat Airport, Spain, to Bilbao Airport, Spain. On Wednesday, February 7, 2001, the Airbus A320, which took off from Barcelona-El Prat Airport, Spain, encountered a microburst-induced wind shear on final approach to Bilbao Airport, Spain. The wind shear caused the plane's landing gear to collapse. All 143 passengers onboard survived; with 25 people suffering light injuries, and 1 person receiving serious injuries. The aircraft was irreparably damaged as a result of the ordeal and was decommissioned soon after, making it the ninth loss of an Airbus A320 at that time. This accident prompted Airbus to develop a fail-safe modification for its flight control software by preventing the airplane's built-in protection against stall from being activated by a high rate of change for the angle of attack.

Aircraft 
The aircraft was manufactured for Iberia in 2000. It had also made its first flight in 2000. At the time of the accident, it had flown for 1,149 hours and 869 cycles. The aircraft was equipped with 2 CFMI CFM56-5B4/P engines.

Crew members 
There were three cockpit crew and four cabin crew.

Cockpit crew 
The captain was a 42-year-old Spanish male who held an Airline Transport Pilot License. He was qualified to fly Airbus A320 aircraft under instrument flight rules (IFR). At the time of the accident, he had a total of 10,805 flight hours. The first officer was a 27-year-old Spanish male who held a Commercial Pilot License. He was qualified to fly Airbus A320 under IFR. At the time of the accident, he had a total of 2,670 flight hours. The trainee pilot, who flew under supervision, was a 24-year-old Spanish male and held a Commercial Pilot License. At the time of the accident, he had a total of 423 flight hours.

Cabin crew 
There were four flight attendants on the aircraft.

Accident 
On Wednesday, February 7, 2001, the Airbus A320 took off from Barcelona-El Prat Airport, Spain. The flight was uneventful until the final approach to Bilbao Airport. The Airbus encountered a microburst-induced wind shear on final approach to the airport. The crew decided to perform a go-around, but the aircraft failed to respond, causing the plane's landing gear to collapse. A subsequent emergency evacuation was carried out. All 143 occupants on the aircraft survived, but 25 people were injured during the evacuation. One crew member and 23 passengers suffered minor injuries, while a female passenger was seriously injured. Seven injured passengers were taken to hospitals. The three pilots were not injured. The aircraft was substantially damaged and written off, making it the ninth hull loss of an Airbus A320.

Other damage 
The runway received minor damage upon the aircraft's hard landing. Two runway edge lights were broken.

Investigation 
The Civil Aviation Accident and Incident Investigation Commission (CIAIAC) immediately launched an investigation into the accident, which took 5 years and 9 months.
The investigation by the CIAIAC concluded:

Aftermath 
This accident prompted Airbus to develop a modification for its flight control software by preventing the airplane's built-in protection against stall from being activated by a high rate of change for the angle of attack. Following this accident, the CIAIAC made four safety recommendations.

References 

Aviation accidents and incidents in 2001
Aviation accidents and incidents in Spain
Airliner accidents and incidents caused by microbursts
Airliner accidents and incidents caused by weather
Accidents and incidents involving the Airbus A320
Iberia (airline) accidents and incidents
2001 in Spain
February 2001 events in Europe